Heinz Bennent (18 July 1921 – 12 October 2011) was a German actor.

Biography

Bennent was born in Stolberg, and served in the Luftwaffe during World War II. His career began after the end of World War II in Göttingen. He moved to Switzerland in the 1970s, where he lived until his death at age 90. He was survived by his son, actor David Bennent, and daughter, actress Anne Bennent.

Selected filmography

Film

1959: Arzt aus Leidenschaft .... Walter Wichert
1960: Madame Pompadour .... Dichter Joseph Calicot
1967:  .... Ulrich
1972: Les rendez-vous en forêt .... Akos
1974: Perahim - die zweite Chance
1975: Section spéciale .... Major Beumelburg
1975: Ice Age .... Pastor Holm
1975: The Lost Honour of Katharina Blum .... Dr. Hubert Blorna
1975: The Net .... Inspector Canonica
1976: Une femme fatale .... Moritz Korber
1976:  .... Philip Ashby
1976: I Want to Live .... Professor Wolfgang Mach
1976:  .... Doctor Relling
1977: The Serpent's Egg .... Professor Hans Vergerus
1978: Germany in Autumn .... Member of the board of TV producers
1978: The Man in the Rushes .... Felix
1978: Brass Target .... Kasten
1979: Son of Hitler .... Ostermayer
1979: The Tin Drum .... Greff
1979: Womanlight .... Georges
1979: Sisters, or the Balance of Happiness .... Münzinger
1980: Lulu .... Dr. Schön
1980: The Last Metro .... Lucas Steiner
1981: Possession .... Heinrich
1982: L'amour des femmes .... Manfred
1982: Le Lit .... Martin
1982: Espion, lève-toi .... Meyer
1982: War and Peace .... Joe
1983: Via degli specchi .... Gianfranco
1983:  .... Pierre Baranne
1983: The Death of Mario Ricci .... Henri Kremer
1985:  .... Heinz Steger
1988: Year of the Turtle .... Heinz August Kamp
1991:  .... Raphaël
1993: Je m'appelle Victor
1994: Elles ne pensent qu'à ça... .... Léon
1995: A French Woman .... Andreas
1995: Tears of Stone .... Herr Richtof
1999: Jonas et Lila, à demain .... Anziano
2000: Cold Is the Evening Breeze .... Hugo Wimmer

Television
1969:  (TV film) .... Edmund Frank
1969:  (TV film) .... Mr. Lorenz, teacher
1970: Eine Rose für Jane (TV film) .... Jones
1971: Tatort:  (TV series episode) .... Pilot Feininger
1972: Der Kommissar: Tod eines Schulmädchens (TV series episode) .... Dr. Gebhardt
1972:  (TV film) .... Akos
1972: Sonderdezernat K1: Vier Schüsse auf den Mörder (TV series episode) .... Jeffrey Simmons 
1973: Der Kommissar: Der Geigenspieler (TV series episode) .... Andreas Kolding
1974: Perahim – die zweite Chance (TV film) .... Perahim
1974: Die Eltern (TV film) .... Michael
1975:  (TV film) .... Gregor Samsa's father
1975: Derrick: Paddenberg (TV series episode) .... Robert Hofer
1975: Tatort:  (TV series episode) .... Martin Koenen
1976: : Der Einarmige (TV series episode) .... Franz Borsig 
1976: Tatort:  (TV series episode) .... Franz Scheller
1976:  (TV series, 13 episodes) .... Dr. Wetzlar
1978: Derrick: Lissas Vater (TV series episode) .... Ludwig Heimer
1980: From the Life of the Marionettes (TV film) .... Arthur Brenner
1981:  (TV miniseries) .... Wolf von Andergast
1982: Derrick: Nachts in einem fremden Haus (TV series episode) .... Dr. Stoll
1983: Derrick: Geheimnisse einer Nacht (TV series episode) .... Gustav Vrings
1985: Derrick: Die Tänzerin (TV series episode) .... Dr. Rohner
1986: Le Tiroir secret (TV miniseries) .... André Lemarchand
1987:  (TV film) .... Feuerbach
1994:  (TV series episode) .... Gustav Jonker
2004:  (TV film) .... Sigmund Freud (final film role)

Awards
In 1980, Bennent was nominated for the César Award for Best Supporting Actor for his role in The Last Metro.

References

External links
 
 Erna Baumbauer Management Munich 

1921 births
2011 deaths
German male film actors
German male television actors
20th-century German male actors
21st-century German male actors
People from Stolberg (Rhineland)
Luftwaffe personnel of World War II
People from the Rhine Province
German Film Award winners